Hélder Manuel Teles Godinho (born 8 September 1977) is a Portuguese former professional footballer who played as a goalkeeper.

Club career
Born in Covilhã, Godinho played in the lower leagues of Portuguese football until the age of 27, when he signed for C.D. Feirense of the second division in the 2004 off-season. During three of the five seasons with the club, he was first-choice.

For 2009–10, Godinho joined Primeira Liga side U.D. Leiria, but was only a backup during his spell, appearing in just eight official matches. He returned to division two in the following campaign, signing with C.D. Aves.

Godinho spent the 2011–12 season with FC Brașov in Romania, playing second-fiddle to compatriot Mário Felgueiras and being released in June 2012.

References

External links

1977 births
Living people
People from Covilhã
Portuguese footballers
Association football goalkeepers
Primeira Liga players
Liga Portugal 2 players
Segunda Divisão players
F.C. Oliveira do Hospital players
Académico de Viseu F.C. players
C.D. Feirense players
U.D. Leiria players
C.D. Aves players
C.D. Santa Clara players
U.D. Oliveirense players
FC Brașov (1936) players
Portuguese expatriate footballers
Expatriate footballers in Romania
Portuguese expatriate sportspeople in Romania
Sportspeople from Castelo Branco District